The Men's 3000 metres steeplechase at the 2014 Commonwealth Games, as part of the athletics programme, took place at Hampden Park on 1 August 2014.

Results

References

Men's 3000 metres steeplechase
2014